Proviantbach is a 4.4 km long canal, parallel to the river Lech in Augsburg, Bavaria, Germany.

See also
List of rivers of Bavaria

CProviantbach
Geography of Bavaria
Canals in Germany